Landscape with Obelisk is a painting by Dutch artist Govert Flinck, painted in 1638. The oil-on-wood painting measures . It was formerly attributed to Rembrandt. The painting hung in the Isabella Stewart Gardner Museum of Boston, Massachusetts, United States, prior to being stolen in 1990.

Provenance
The painting hung in the Isabella Stewart Gardner Museum of Boston, Massachusetts, prior to being stolen on March 18, 1990. The painting has not resurfaced. A $5 million reward, since doubled to $10 million, is offered for the return of the stolen items.

See also
 Isabella Stewart Gardner Museum theft
 List of stolen paintings

References

1638 paintings
Paintings by Govaert Flinck
Landscape paintings
Stolen works of art